Jirandeh Rural District is a rural district (dehestan) in Amarlu District, Rudbar County, Gilan Province, Iran. At the 2006 census, its population was 2,826, in 829 families. The rural district has 16 villages.

References 

Rural Districts of Gilan Province
Rudbar County